Monte Alén National Park  is located near the center of Equatorial Guinea. It was established in 1990. The goliath frog (Conraua goliath), one of the prominent amphibians found in the park, is the biggest frog in the world; hunting it is prohibited.

Geography
It was declared a national park under a presidential decree in 2000 in addition to 13 other areas. The highest mountain peaks of Monte Alen and Monte Mitra (the source of the major rivers in the area) lie within the limits of the park. Uoro River lies to the west of the park. The eastern part of the park is bounded by the Niefang-Gabon road. There are a few patches of rock outcrops. Lake Atoc has forest cover in its entire catchment.

Trekking paths are well laid out in the park. Logging operation within the park is fully controlled.

Fauna

The park has recorded 265 species of birds. Some of the prominent species include three montane species, Coracina caesia, Dryoscopus angolensis and Phylloscopus herberti; Phylloscopus budongoensis, the only warblers species found in the park; Picathartes oreas; Melignomon zenkeri; Muscicapa tessmanni and Batis minima; possibly Apus sladeniae.

The park has 105 mammal species which includes 16 species of primates. Some of the primate species recorded are Colobus satanas, Cercocebus torquatus, mandrills (Mandrillus sphinx), gorillas (Gorilla gorilla) and chimpanzees (Pan troglodytes). Other mammal species include elephants (bush elephants, Loxodonta africana, and forest elephants, Loxodonta cyclotis), and shrews (Crocidura grassei). Sixty-five species of reptiles are reported, including crocodiles. Amphibians reported include Petropedetes palmipes and Leptodactylodon stevarti which are in the IUCN Red List. Goliath frogs (Conraura goliath) are found in the southern part of the park.

Conservation

In 1989, conservation of the forest area of the park was zoned for purpose of awarding concessions for logging, and agroforestry activities were encouraged. A study conducted under USAID observed that hunting of mammals in the park was a serious issue which needed  urgent remedial conservation action. By 2005, Caldecott reported that agriculture, hunting, and logging were not allowed in the park.

Bibliography

References

National parks of Equatorial Guinea
Protected areas established in 1990